Penafiel ( or  is a municipality and former bishopric (now a Latin Catholic titular see) in the northern Portuguese district of Porto.

History 

The region was occupied since pre-history, as evidenced by the proliferation of megalithic monuments, stone settlements and castros. In addition, there are various rock forts (castros), subject of archaeological studies, such as the archaeological "city of the dead" in Citânia de Monte Mozinho. One of the largest in the Iberian Peninsula, it was the precursor to the Galician organized community of Cividade Gallaeci; the hill fort is dotted with traces of various cultures: Galician-Lusitanian, Roman, Visigoth and Moorish. There different legends that indicate the origins of the name Penafiel, although the common thread associates it with the many forts situated in the locality.

With the consolidation and incorporation into the Roman world, these hill forts were reorganized and moved down from the hilltops, dispersing into concentrated settlements in open areas and encircled by cultivated parcels, such as in Bouça do Ouro (Boelhe). The Roman spa town of São Vicente do Pinheiro was an example of these centres, developing around the natural resources in the region. In addition, vains of gold interspersed in the Schist and Quartzite quarries attracted Roman settlers from the empire, resulting in an intense artisanal economy, supported by the circulation of a single currency, culture and language.

In the 9th century, activity became concentrated in the Civitas Anegia on the headwaters of the Tâmega and Douro, that dominated the lands along margins of those rivers. This civitas was the precursor of Penafiel de Canas, an area that assumed an import role, but occupied a smaller area and embryonic place that concentrated on agriculture and fishing. The lands were seats of the Romanesque ecclesiastical seigneurs of the Benedictine monasteries of Paço de Sousa and Bustelo. Supporting a rich cultural influence, Paço de Sousa boasted a magnificent Romanesque architecture and gave shelter to the historian Egas Moniz Ribadouro, schoolmaster of Afonso Henriques. Other noble houses of medieval period include Barbosa de Honor (Rans), with its tower overlooking agricultural lands, or the transformed tower of Coreixas (Irivo). Romanesque religious architecture proliferated during the post-Roman period; the Romanesque temple of Boelhe or Church of São Salvador da Gândara (venerating a deceased saint's skull) attracted pilgrims to the region, as did the Church of Abragão, the late-Gothic Church of São Miguel da Eja and the funerary memorial of Ermida (Irivo).

During this time emerged a new reality: a fortified settlement that developed in the parish of Moazares, home of the Romanesque church of Santa Luzia (circled by sculpted tombs) was along the banks of the river, along the roadway from Porto and crossing the Sousa at the medieval bridge of Cepeda was an ideal local to build an urban community to specialize in services, artesnal commerce and sale of manufactured goods, supported by a medieval fair. The area was known as Arrifana de Sousa. Legend suggests that name came from the name Ariana (the daughter of Hermenegildo González and D. Mumadona Dias) who, following her father's death, inherited the land in the 10th century.

At its founding, it was dominated by two castles: one along the northern bank of the Sousa river, called the Castle of Aguiar de Sousa and the second along the southern margin, called Pena. The town was attacked several times by Moors, but, owing to its resistance was referred to in Latin as Pennafidelis, shortened to the Castle of Penafiel.

By the 13th century, many of the plots of land were owned by Castile's ex-Queen Mafalda of Portugal.

The civil parish of Arrifana de Sousa was established in the sixteenth century. In the same century, in 1519, King Manuel I of Portugal granted the region a foral (charter) that raised the settlement to the status of village. Yet, its change would only occur in the reign of King D. John V (by decree on 7 October 1741).

The site was crossed by various roads, where João Correia, a rich Portoense merchant with contracts in Flanders established his home; he was a new Christian, who raised a Manueline chapel to the Holy Spirit (and who erected his bronze funerary tomb).

As it grew, Arrifana assumed as patron saint São Martinho (Marin), and in the middle of the 16th century, a new Mannerist temple was constructed over the old chapel of João Correia.

The lands continued as an administrative dependency of Porto, until King D. John I conceded it a privilege for supporting his cause.

Arrifana de Sousa continued to grow as a centre of services and industry, supported by an annual fair on the feast day of São Martinho, resulting in the expansion of the urban environment to the upper elevations and the construction of the Church of the Misericórdia. Meanwhile, the nobles established their homes outside the town centre, preferring to live in their ancestral estates, established from the land rents and businesses and overseas commerce.

By law, during the reign of King Joseph (dated 3 March 1770), the place name was officially changed to Penafiel and the status of city conferred.

Ecclesiastical history 

On 1 June 1770, by papal bull issued by Pope Clement XIV, the Diocese of Penafiel was established, separating it from the ecclesiastical Diocese of Porto, apparently as suffragan of the Metropolitan Archdiocese of Braga.

The Pope appointed the Carmelite Friar Inácio de São Caetano (born 1718.07.31), confessor of the future Queen Maria I of Portugal (then Princess of Brazil), as its first prelate. But he would never administer the Diocese (as he was in Brazil), and was eventually convinced by the Queen to give-up the bishopric, consoled with a nominal promotion as Titular Archbishop of Thessalonica (1778.12.14 – death 1788.11.29), while she successfully requested the Holy See to undo the See creation.

On 11 November 1778, Pope Pius VI decided by motu proprio to extinguish the diocese, incorporating its administration (once more) into the mother Diocese of Porto, which it remains part of.

The Church of Our Lady of Mercy, which had been bombarded its cathedral, lost that status without being made co-cathedral.

Titular see 

In 1969 the diocese was nominally restored as Latin Titular bishopric of Penafiel (Portuguese) /  (Latin adjective).

It has had the following incumbents, mostly of the fitting Episcopal (lowest) rank, with an archiepiscopal exception :
 Bernard Theodore Espelage, Friars Minor (O.F.M.) (1969.08.25 – death 1971.02.19) as emeritate, former Bishop of Gallup (USA) (1940.07.20 – retired 1969.08.25)
 John Joseph Mulcahy (1974.12.28 – death 1994.04.26) as Auxiliary Bishop of Archdiocese of Boston (Massachusetts, USA) (1974.12.28 – retired 1992.07.21) and emeritate
 Francisco-Javier Lozano Sebastián (1994.07.09 – ...) as papal diplomat : Apostolic Nuncio (ambassador) to Tanzania (1994.07.09 – 1999.03.20), Apostolic Nuncio to Democratic Republic of Congo (1999.03.20 – 2001.12.15), Apostolic Nuncio to Croatia (2003.08.04 – 2007.12.10), Apostolic Nuncio to Moldova (2007.12.10 – 2015.12.05), Apostolic Nuncio to Romania (2007.12.10 – 2015.12.05).

 Geography 

 Physical geography 
It is a landscape of deep valleys, with intense irrigated zones and pasturelands, with fields encircled by forests of pine and eucalyptus. This inter-fluvial region have granite soils and is rich in water resources, permitting intensive agriculture and extraction industries. The southwest extension of the municipality include a complex of Schist and Greywacke geology, resulting in mountainous, uncultivated and largely forest lands.

An intermediary zone, dividing the littoral and mountainous regions, the region was an important transitory point, with lines of communication extending along inter-regional, land and fluvial networks. The first example was the "royal roadways" that date to the medieval period, that connect Porto and the Trás-os-Montes, that resulted the development of the urban centre, that was a fulcrum in supporting transiting peoples and goods. The Douro was an important link and penetrated the interior, while the flanks of the Alto Douro were used to produce vineyards. The "Entre-os-Rios" district was also an important part in supporting travel along the interior.

Climate
Penafiel has a Mediterranean climate (Köppen: Csb) with cool to mild, rainy winters and warm to hot, dry summers

Human geography

With 28 civil parishes it includes a resident population of 72,000 inhabitants (approximately 338.4 people per kilometre square), integrated into the Associação de Municípios do Vale do Sousa (Vale de Sousa Municipal Association) and NUTSIII Tâmega Subregion. The region is settled, but in dispersed enclaves, supported by small industry and commerce, while newer residential homes juxtaposition older rural dwellings. These older homes are usually maintained by part-time farming families and seniors, perpetuated by intense migration and facilitated by their proximity to major roadways.

The municipality is administered by the following civil parishes (freguesias):

 Abragão
 Boelhe
 Bustelo
 Cabeça Santa
 Canelas
 Capela
 Castelões
 Croca
 Duas Igrejas
 Eja
 Fonte Arcada
 Galegos
 Guilhufe e Urrô
 Irivo
 Lagares e Figueira
 Luzim e Vila Cova
 Oldrões
 Paço de Sousa
 Penafiel
 Perozelo
 Rans
 Rio de Moinhos
 Rio Mau
 São Mamede de Recezinhos
 São Martinho de Recezinhos
 Sebolido
 Termas de São Vicente
 Valpedre

The parishes are, largely, semi-industrialized, with a mixture of modern homes and rural dwellings in nature. Villages have houses made with small stones and granite, both of which are common in locality of Penafiel.

 Economy 
Extraction industries, civil construction firms and commerce employs a large number of workers, in addition to a strong concentration of service sector activities, confirmed by a Penafiel's central place in the regional economy.

Penafiel invested in new schools and renovating others during the 20th century, maintaining several kindergartens, primary and secondary schools.

The municipal council is responsible for maintaining several health centres, clinics and hospital, with Padre Américo Hospital situated in the parish of Guilhufe.

The council has some train stations in their territory of buses throughout the country and a vast road system.

 Tourism 
Penafiel is the centre for therapeutic treatments and spas, highlighted by the São Vicente Spa and the Inatel Entre-os Rios Spa. The São Vicente is known for the characteristic quality of its waters: the spa is known for the hyper-mineralized waters, that include concentrated sulphurous and carbonaceous akline silicates and fluoridated water.

One of the largest Portuguese is located in Penafiel: Magikland, formerly Bracalândia (and had moved from Braga), where it prospered.

Tourism is cyclical in the region, influence by the staggering of religious and secular activities, but marked by special events throughout the year, particularly around the religious feast of São Martinho. This includes the literary festival Escritaria and the agricultural fair Agrival, which had its basis in the traditional medieval fairs.

 Historical heritage 

 
The region of Penafiel is known for a history dating to the pre-historic period, marked by dolmens, petroglyphs, necropoli and fortified settlements constructed of stone. But, over time and through the influence of various cultural groups (Romans, Visigoths, Moors) the area began to evolve into a modern centre, marked by the evolution in its architecture from rudimentary stone dolmens to signeurial manorhouses and monumental estates.

 Archaeological 

 Castro of Monte Mozinho
 Dolmen of Santa Marta (
 Menhir of Luzim
 Prehistoric Rock-Art Site of Lomar
 Prehistoric Rock-Art Site of Pegadinhas de São Gonçalo
 Prehistoric Rock-Art Site of Tapada das Eiras
 Tomb of Monte de São Roque

 Civic architecture 

 Aqueduct of the Monastery of Bustelo
 Asylum of Santo António dos Capuchos
 Bridge Duarte Pacheco
 Bridge of Espindo
 Bridge of Lardosa
 Bridge of Rans (
 Bridge of Santa Marta
 Bridge of Vau
 Estate of Cimo de Vila
 Estate of Abol
 Estate of Aveleda
 Estate of Boveira
 Estate of Casa Nova
 Estate of Companhia
 Estate of Curveira
 Estate of Fentão de Baixo
 Estate of Maragossa
 Estate of Mesão Fria
 Estate of Mogol
 Estate of Pena
 Estate of Perosinho
 Estate of Souto
 Estate of Ventuzela
 Fountain Armoriada
 Hospital Padre Américo Vale do Sousa
 Jailhouse of Penafiel
 Judicial Courts of Penafiel
 Manorhouse and Tower of Honra de Barbosa
 Municipal Palace/Hall of Penafiel
 Palace Hotel of Termas de São Vicente
 Penafiel Railway Station
 Pillory of Honra de Barbosa
 Pillory of Penafiel
 Residence of Cantoneiros
 Residence of Reboleira
 School of Novelas
 Thermal Spa of Quinta da Torre
 Thermal Spa of São Vicente
 Tower of Coreixas

 Religious architecture 

 Chapel of the Divino Salvador
 Chapel of Lagares
 Chapel of Menino Jesus
 Chapel of Nossa Senhora da Ajuda
 Chapel of Nossa Senhora da Cividade
 Chapel of Nossa Senhora do Desterro
 Chapel of Nossa Senhora da Lurdes
 Chapel of Nossa Senhora do Monte e São Brás
 Chapel of Nossa Senhora de Paz
 Chapel of Nossa Senhora do Rosário
 Chapel of Nossa Senhora da Saude
 Chapel of the Sagrada Familia
 Chapel of the Santa Casa da Misericórdia
 Chapel of Santa Luzia
 Chapel of Santo António
 Chapel of São Bartolomeu
 Chapel of São Bartolomeu de Louredo
 Chapel of São Domingos
 Chapel of São João Baptista
 Chapel of São Julião
 Chapel of São Lourenço
 Chapel of São Mateus
 Chapel of São Pedro
 Chapel of São Roque
 Chapel of São Sebastião
 Chapel of São Simão
 Chapel of Senhor dos Aflitos
 Chapel of Senhor do Calvário
 Chapel of Senhor do Monte
 Chapel of the Thermals of Quinta da Torre
 Chapel of the Thermals of São Vicente
 Convent of Santo António dos Capuchos
 Chris the King of São Mamede de Recezinhos (
 Church of the Divino Salvador
 Church of Nossa Senhora de Fátima
 Church of Nossa Senhora da Saúde
 Church of Nossa Senhora da Visitação
 Church of Santo Adrião
 Church of Santo André
 Church of Santo Estêvão
 Church of Santa Maria
 Church of Santa Marinha
 Church of Santa Marta
 Church of Santiago
 Church of São João Baptista
 Church of São João Evangelista
 Church of São Mamede
 Church of São Mamede de Recezinhos
 Church of São Martinho
 Church of São Martinho de Recezinhos
 Church of São Martinho de Tours
 Church of São Miguel
 Church of São Paio
 Church of São Paulo
 Church of São Pedro
 Church of São Gens
 Church of São Salvador
 Church of São Tiago
 Church of São Tomé
 Church of São Vicente
 Church of Santa Casa da Misericórdia
 Hermitage Memorial
 Monastery of Bustelo
 Monastery of Paço de Sousa
 Niche of Nossa Senhora de Fátima da Igreja
 Niche of Nossa Senhora de Fátima de São Mamede
 Niche of Nossa Senhora de Fátima de Uchada
 Niche of São José
 Paroquial Residence of Abragão
 Paroquial Residence of São Martinho de Recezinhos
 Sanctuary of Senhor dos Remédios
 Sanctuary of Senhora da Piedade e Santos Passos
 Way of the Cross of Penafiel
 Way of the Cross of Senhor dos Passos

Penafiel began building its library in 1863. On 6 June 1917, a new Municipal Library of Penafiel was inaugurated, located on Avenue Araújo e Silva, which closed in October 1919, reopened to the public on 6 June 1927 and was transferred to a small lounge on Avenida Sacadura Cabral.

 Sports 
The most popular/practised sport within the municipality is football (soccer), leading hundreds of young people to the existing clubs. The largest club, FC Penafiel, was founded in 1951 and has regular presence on many levels of professional Portuguese seasons. During the 2014–2015 season, the club played in the Premier League after obtaining a rise from the previous season, finishing in 3rd place behind Moreirense (Champion) and FC Porto B. The club is also involved in other athletics activities winning several national and international competitions.

 Notable people 

 José do Telhado (1818-1875) a Portuguese bandit. 
 Vitorino Guimarães (1876–1957) an economist and politician & 91st Prime Minister of Portugal in 1925
 Neno Vasco (1878–1920) a poet, lawyer, journalist, anarchist, writer and ardent revolutionary syndicalist
 António Ferreira Gomes (1906-1989) a Portuguese Roman Catholic bishop
 António Barbosa de Melo (1932–2016) a Portuguese lawyer, politician and parliamentarian
 Rosário Gambôa (born 1956) a Portuguese academic and politician.
 Vitorino Silva (born 1971) known as Tino de Rans'', a pavement-maker, TV personality and politician.

Sport 
 António Oliveira (born 1952) a retired footballer with 306 club caps and 24 for Portugal.
 José Coelho (born 1961) a retired footballer with 407 club caps and 8 for Portugal.
 Agostinho Caetano (born 1966) a retired footballer with 320 club caps and 2 for Portugal.
 Fernanda Ribeiro (born 1969) a long-distance runner,  gold medallist in the women's 10,000m at the 1996 Summer Olympics
 Abel Ferreira (born 1978) a former footballer and current coach of Palmeiras
 Hélder Ferreira (born 1980) a retired footballer with 320 club caps
 José Fonte (born 1983) a footballer with over 600 club caps and 49 for Portugal.
 Pedro Moreira (born 1983) a former footballer with 378 club caps.
 Nuno Morais (born 1984) a former footballer with 417 club caps.
 Vítor Silva (born 1984) a footballer with over 330 club caps.

See also 
 List of Catholic dioceses in Portugal

References

Sources and external links 

 GCatholic - former & titular bishopric
 Photos from Penafiel
 GCatholic - former cathedral

 
Cities in Portugal
Municipalities of Porto District

nl:Penafiel